Martin Bača (born 30 September 1985) is a professional Czech football player who currently plays for FC Tescoma Zlín. He has made more than 100 appearances in the Gambrinus liga.

References

External links
 Profile at FC Tescoma Zlín website

Czech footballers
Czech Republic youth international footballers
Czech Republic under-21 international footballers
1985 births
Living people
Czech First League players
FC Fastav Zlín players
FC Nitra players
FC Vysočina Jihlava players

Association football forwards